The 1930 Norwegian Football Cup was the 29th season of the Norwegian annual knockout football tournament. The tournament was open for all members of NFF, except those from Northern Norway. The final was played at Brann Stadion in Bergen on 19 October 1930, and was contested by the last year's losing finalist Ørn and Drammens BK, who played their first and only final. Ørn, who played in their fifth consecutive final, won the final 4-2, and secured their third title in five years, and fourth title in total.

Rounds and dates
 First round: 10 August
 Second round: 17 August
 Third round: 31 August
 Fourth round: 14 September
 Quarter-finals: 28 September
 Semi-finals: 5 October
 Final: 19 October

First round 

|-
|colspan="3" style="background-color:#97DEFF"|Replay

|}

Second round 

|-
|colspan="3" style="background-color:#97DEFF"|Replay

|}

Third round

|-
|colspan="3" style="background-color:#97DEFF"|Replay

|}

Fourth round

|}

Quarter-finals

|-
|colspan="3" style="background-color:#97DEFF"|Replay

|}

Semi-finals

|}

Final

See also
1930 in Norwegian football

References

Norwegian Football Cup seasons
Norway
Cup